Zale helata, the brown-spotted zale, is a moth of the family Noctuidae. The species was first described by James Halliday McDunnough in 1943. It is found in barrens and pine woodlands from Manitoba to Maine, south to northern Alabama and Texas.  

The wingspan is 35–41 mm. Adults are on wing from May to June. There is one generation per year.

The larvae feed on hard and soft pines (especially Pinus virginiana (scrub or Virginia pine) in the south) and rarely on larch. They feed on young needles that are not yet fully hardened.

External links

"Brown-spotted Zale (Zale helata)". Forest Pests. Archived October 31, 2007. With larval stage info.

Catocalinae
Moths of North America
Moths described in 1943